Eino Matias Mäkinen (13 June 1926 – 13 August 2014) was a Finnish heavyweight weightlifter. He won two bronze medals at the world championships in 1955 and 1961 and five medals at the European championships in 1954–1961, including a gold in 1955. He competed at the 1952, 1956, 1960 and 1964 Olympics with the best result of fifth place in 1956 and 1960.

References

1926 births
2014 deaths
Olympic weightlifters of Finland
Weightlifters at the 1952 Summer Olympics
Weightlifters at the 1956 Summer Olympics
Weightlifters at the 1960 Summer Olympics
Weightlifters at the 1964 Summer Olympics
People from Ylöjärvi
Finnish male weightlifters
European Weightlifting Championships medalists
World Weightlifting Championships medalists
Sportspeople from Pirkanmaa
20th-century Finnish people
21st-century Finnish people